Spergau is a village and a former municipality in the district Saalekreis, in Saxony-Anhalt, Germany. Since 31 December 2009, it is part of the town Leuna.

Former municipalities in Saxony-Anhalt
Leuna